Settlement council can refer to:
 Selsoviet, the lowest level of administrative division in rural areas in the Soviet Union
 Settlement council (Ukraine), a local government area for urban-type settlements in Ukraine